Expedition Atlantis is the name given to the crossing of the Atlantic Ocean made by five Argentines in 1984, leaving from the port of Tenerife in the Canary Islands and 52 days later arriving in La Guaira, Venezuela.

The aim was to prove that 3500 years before Christopher Columbus, African sailors may have accidentally reached the shores of America led by specific ocean currents.

The crew consisted of Alfredo Barragan, Jorge Iriberri, Horacio Giaccaglia, Daniel Sanchez Magariños and Felix Arrieta.

The departure date was May 22, 1984, and landfall was made 52 days later, on July 12, 1984.

See also
 
 Pre-Columbian transoceanic contact theories

External links 
  (Documentary filmed during the expedition)
 https://web.archive.org/web/20140202161516/http://www.yachtingtimesmagazine.com/en/notas/issue03/02.php?lang=en (English)
 https://web.archive.org/web/20140203030420/http://www.puertosdetenerife.org/memorias/memoria2010/9/9-sociocultural-activity-en.html (English)
 http://edant.clarin.com/diario/2009/07/12/sociedad/s-01956968.htm (Spanish)
 http://adan.org.ar/web/index.php?option=com_content&task=view&id=133&Itemid=39 (Spanish)
 http://revistaelfederal.com/nota/revista/25180/alfredo-barragan-el-poeta-de-la-expedicion (Spanish)
 https://web.archive.org/web/20111228163137/http://www.proyecto-ithaca.com/atlantis.html (Spanish)
 https://web.archive.org/web/20090425115528/http://www.veleromistico.com.ar/atlantis.htm (Spanish)
 https://web.archive.org/web/20140202221312/http://www.elurbanodesancarlos.com/noticias/locales/12697-charla-abierta-a-cargo-del-dr-alfredo-barragan-expedicion-atlantis-el-desafio-de-los-imposibles (Spanish)
 http://edant.clarin.com/diario/2009/08/17/sociedad/s-01979859.htm (Spanish)
 http://edant.clarin.com/diario/1999/06/07/e-03103d.htm (Spanish)
 http://www.lanacion.com.ar/1161238-un-gran-sueno (Spanish)
 http://www.lanacion.com.ar/628130-alfredo-barragan-una-pasion-extrema (Spanish)
 http://www.lanacion.com.ar/1407113-desafiando-imposibles (Spanish)

Navigation